

Events

Pre-1600
98 – On the death of Nerva, Trajan is declared Roman emperor in Cologne, the seat of his government in lower Germany. 
 814 – The death of Charlemagne, the first Holy Roman Emperor, brings about the accession of his son Louis the Pious as ruler of the Frankish Empire.
1069 – Robert de Comines, appointed Earl of Northumbria by William the Conqueror, rides into Durham, England, where he is defeated and killed by rebels. This incident leads to the Harrying of the North.
1077 – Walk to Canossa: The excommunication of Henry IV, Holy Roman Emperor, is lifted after he humbles himself before Pope Gregory VII at Canossa in Italy.
1521 – The Diet of Worms begins, lasting until May 25.
1547 – Edward VI, the nine-year-old son of Henry VIII, becomes King of England on his father's death.
1568 – The Edict of Torda prohibits the persecution of individuals on religious grounds in John Sigismund Zápolya's Eastern Hungarian Kingdom.
1573 – Articles of the Warsaw Confederation are signed, sanctioning freedom of religion in Poland.
1591 – Execution of Agnes Sampson, accused of witchcraft in Edinburgh.

1601–1900
1624 – Sir Thomas Warner founds the first British colony in the Caribbean, on the island of Saint Kitts.
1671 – Original city of Panama (founded in 1519) is destroyed by a fire when privateer Henry Morgan sacks and sets fire to it. The site of the previously devastated city is still in ruins (see Panama Viejo).
1724 – The Russian Academy of Sciences is founded in St. Petersburg, Russia, by Peter the Great, and implemented by Senate decree. It is called the St. Petersburg Academy of Sciences until 1917.
1754 – Sir Horace Walpole coins the word serendipity in a letter to a friend. 
1813 – Jane Austen's Pride and Prejudice is first published in the United Kingdom. 
1846 – The Battle of Aliwal, India, is won by British troops commanded by Sir Harry Smith.
1851 – Northwestern University becomes the first chartered university in Illinois.
1855 – A locomotive on the Panama Canal Railway runs from the Atlantic Ocean to the Pacific Ocean for the first time.
1871 – Franco-Prussian War: The Siege of Paris ends in French defeat and an armistice.
1878 – Yale Daily News becomes the first independent daily college newspaper in the United States.
1896 – Walter Arnold of East Peckham, Kent, becomes the first person to be convicted of speeding.

1901–present
1902 – The Carnegie Institution of Washington is founded in Washington, D.C. with a $10 million gift from Andrew Carnegie.
1908 – Members of the Portuguese Republican Party fail in their attempted coup d'état against the administrative dictatorship of Prime Minister João Franco.
1909 – United States troops leave Cuba, with the exception of Guantanamo Bay Naval Base, after being there since the Spanish–American War.
1915 – An act of the U.S. Congress creates the United States Coast Guard as a branch of the United States Armed Forces.
1916 – The Canadian province of Manitoba grants women the right to vote and run for office in provincial elections (although still excluding women of Indigenous or Asian heritage), marking the first time women in Canada are granted voting rights.
1918 – Finnish Civil War: The Red Guard rebels seize control of the capital, Helsinki; members of the Senate of Finland go underground.
1919 – The Order of the White Rose of Finland is established by Baron Gustaf Mannerheim, the regent of the Kingdom of Finland.
1920 – Foundation of the Spanish Legion.
1922 – Knickerbocker Storm: Washington, D.C.'s biggest snowfall, causes a disaster when the roof of the Knickerbocker Theatre collapses, killing over 100 people.
1932 – Japanese forces attack Shanghai.
1933 – The name Pakistan is coined by Choudhry Rahmat Ali Khan and is accepted by Indian Muslims who then thereby adopted it further for the Pakistan Movement seeking independence.
1935 – Iceland becomes the first Western country to legalize therapeutic abortion.
1941 – Franco-Thai War: Final air battle of the conflict. A Japanese-mediated armistice goes into effect later in the day.
1945 – World War II: Supplies begin to reach the Republic of China over the newly reopened Burma Road.
1956 – Elvis Presley makes his first national television appearance.
1958 – The Lego company patents the design of its Lego bricks, still compatible with bricks produced today.
1960 – The National Football League announces expansion teams for Dallas to start in the 1960 NFL season and Minneapolis-St. Paul for the 1961 NFL season.
1964 – An unarmed United States Air Force T-39 Sabreliner on a training mission is shot down over Erfurt, East Germany, by a Soviet MiG-19.
1965 – The current design of the Flag of Canada is chosen by an act of Parliament.
1977 – The first day of the Great Lakes Blizzard of 1977, which dumps  of snow in one day in Upstate New York. Buffalo, Syracuse, Watertown, and surrounding areas are most affected.
1980 –  collides with the tanker Capricorn while leaving Tampa, Florida and capsizes, killing 23 Coast Guard crewmembers.
1981 – Ronald Reagan lifts remaining domestic petroleum price and allocation controls in the United States, helping to end the 1979 energy crisis and begin the 1980s oil glut.
1982 – US Army General James L. Dozier is rescued by Italian anti-terrorism forces from captivity by the Red Brigades.
1984 – Tropical Storm Domoina makes landfall in southern Mozambique, eventually causing 214 deaths and some of the most severe flooding so far recorded in the region.
1985 – Supergroup USA for Africa (United Support of Artists for Africa) records the hit single We Are the World, to help raise funds for Ethiopian famine relief.
1986 – Space Shuttle program: STS-51-L mission: Space Shuttle Challenger disintegrates after liftoff, killing all seven astronauts on board.
1988 – In R v Morgentaler the Supreme Court of Canada strikes down all anti-abortion laws.
2002 – TAME Flight 120, a Boeing 727-100, crashes in the Andes mountains in southern Colombia, killing 94.
2006 – The roof of one of the buildings at the Katowice International Fair in Poland collapses due to the weight of snow, killing 65 and injuring more than 170 others.
2021 – A nitrogen leak at a poultry food processing facility in Gainesville, Georgia kills six and injures at least ten.
2023 – Protests begin after police beat and kill Tyre Nichols.

Births

Pre-1600
 598 – Tai Zong, emperor of the Tang Dynasty (d. 649)
1312 – Joan II, queen of Navarre (d. 1349)
1368 – Razadarit, king of Hanthawaddy (d. 1421) 
1457 – Henry VII, king of England (d. 1509)
1533 – Paul Luther, German scientist (d. 1593)
1540 – Ludolph van Ceulen, German-Dutch mathematician and academic (d. 1610)
1582 – John Barclay, French-Scottish poet and author (d. 1621)
1600 – Clement IX, pope of the Catholic Church (d. 1669)

1601–1900
1608 – Giovanni Alfonso Borelli, Italian physiologist and physicist (d. 1679)
1611 – Johannes Hevelius, Polish astronomer and politician (d. 1687)
1622 – Adrien Auzout, French astronomer and instrument maker (d. 1691)
1693 – Gregor Werner, Austrian composer (d. 1766)
1701 – Charles Marie de La Condamine, French mathematician and geographer (d. 1774)
1706 – John Baskerville, English printer and typographer (d. 1775)
1712 – Tokugawa Ieshige, Japanese shōgun (d. 1761)
1717 – Mustafa III, Ottoman sultan (d. 1774)
1719 – Johann Elias Schlegel, German poet and critic (d. 1749)
  1726   – Christian Felix Weiße, German poet and playwright (d. 1802)
1755 – Samuel Thomas von Sömmerring, Polish-German physician, anthropologist, and paleontologist (d. 1830)
1784 – George Hamilton-Gordon, 4th Earl of Aberdeen, Scottish politician, Prime Minister of the United Kingdom (d. 1860)
1797 – Charles Gray Round, English lawyer and politician (d. 1867)
1818 – George S. Boutwell, American lawyer and politician, 28th United States Secretary of the Treasury (d. 1905)
1822 – Alexander Mackenzie, Scottish-Canadian politician, 2nd Prime Minister of Canada (d. 1892)
1833 – Charles George Gordon, English general and politician (d. 1885)
1853 – José Martí, Cuban journalist, poet, and theorist (d. 1895)
  1853   – Vladimir Solovyov, Russian philosopher, poet, and critic (d. 1900)
1855 – William Seward Burroughs I, American businessman, founded the Burroughs Corporation (d. 1898)
1858 – Tannatt William Edgeworth David, Welsh-Australian geologist and explorer (d. 1934)
1861 – Julián Felipe, Filipino composer and educator (d. 1944)
1863 – Ernest William Christmas, Australian-American painter (d. 1918)
1864 – Charles W. Nash, American businessman, founded Nash Motors (d. 1948)
1865 – Lala Lajpat Rai, Indian author and politician (d. 1928)
  1865   – Kaarlo Juho Ståhlberg, Finnish lawyer, judge, and politician, 1st President of Finland (d. 1952)
1873 – Colette, French novelist and journalist (d. 1954)
  1873   – Monty Noble, Australian cricketer (d. 1940)
1874 – Alex Smith, Scottish golfer (d. 1930)
1875 – Julián Carrillo, Mexican violinist, composer, and conductor (d. 1965)
1878 – Walter Kollo, German composer and conductor (d. 1940)
1880 – Herbert Strudwick, English cricketer and coach (d. 1970)
1884 – Auguste Piccard, Swiss physicist and explorer (d. 1962)
1885 – Vahan Terian, Armenian poet and activist (d. 1920)
1886 – Marthe Bibesco, Romanian-French author and poet (d. 1973)
  1886   – Hidetsugu Yagi, Japanese engineer and academic (d. 1976)
1887 – Arthur Rubinstein, Polish-American pianist and educator (d. 1982)
1897 – Valentin Kataev, Russian author and playwright (d. 1986)
1900 – Alice Neel, American painter (d. 1984)

1901–present
1903 – Aleksander Kamiński, Polish author and educator (d. 1978)
  1903   – Kathleen Lonsdale, Irish crystallographer and 1st female FRS (d. 1971)
1906 – Pat O'Callaghan, Irish athlete (d. 1991)
  1906   – Markos Vafiadis, Greek general and politician (d. 1992)
1908 – Paul Misraki, Turkish-French composer and historian (d. 1998)
1909 – John Thomson, Scottish footballer (d. 1931)
1910 – John Banner, Austrian actor (d. 1973)
1911 – Johan van Hulst, Dutch politician, academic and author, Yad Vashem recipient (d. 2018)
1912 – Jackson Pollock, American painter (d. 1956)
1918 – Harry Corbett, English puppeteer, actor, and screenwriter (d. 1989)
  1918   – Trevor Skeet, New Zealand-English lawyer and politician (d. 2004)
1919 – Gabby Gabreski, American colonel and pilot (d. 2002)
1920 – Lewis Wilson, American actor (d. 2000)
1921 – Vytautas Norkus, Lithuanian–American basketball player (d. 2014)
1922 – Anna Gordy Gaye, American songwriter and producer, co-founded Anna Records (d. 2014)
  1922   – Robert W. Holley, American biochemist and academic, Nobel Prize laureate (d. 1993)
1924 – Marcel Broodthaers, Belgian painter and poet (d. 1976)
1925 – Raja Ramanna, Indian physicist and politician (d. 2004) 
1926 – Jimmy Bryan, American race car driver (d. 1960)
1927 – Per Oscarsson, Swedish actor, director, producer, and screenwriter (d. 2010)
  1927   – Ronnie Scott, English saxophonist (d. 1996)
  1927   – Hiroshi Teshigahara, Japanese director, producer, and screenwriter (d. 2001)
  1927   – Vera Williams, American author and illustrator (d. 2015)
1929 – Acker Bilk, English singer and clarinet player (d. 2014)
  1929   – Nikolai Parshin, Russian footballer and manager (d. 2012)
  1929   – Claes Oldenburg, Swedish-American sculptor and illustrator (d. 2022)
  1929   – Edith M. Flanigen, American chemist
1930 – Kurt Biedenkopf, German academic and politician, 54th President of the German Bundesrat (d. 2021)
  1930   – Roy Clarke, English screenwriter, comedian and soldier
1933 – Jack Hill, American director and screenwriter
1934 – Juan Manuel Bordeu, Argentinian race car driver (d. 1990)
1935 – David Lodge, English author and critic
1936 – Alan Alda, American actor, director, and writer
  1936   – Ismail Kadare, Albanian novelist, poet, essayist, and playwright
1937 – Karel Čáslavský, Czech historian and television host (d. 2013)
  1937   – John Normington, English actor (d. 2007)
1938 – Tomas Lindahl, Swedish-English biologist and academic, Nobel Prize laureate
  1938   – Leonid Zhabotinsky, Ukrainian weightlifter and coach (d. 2016)
1939 – John M. Fabian, American colonel, pilot, and astronaut
1940 – Carlos Slim, Mexican businessman and philanthropist, founded Grupo Carso
1941 – Joel Crothers, American actor (d. 1985)
1942 – Sjoukje Dijkstra, Dutch figure skater
  1942   – Erkki Pohjanheimo, Finnish director and producer
1943 – Dick Taylor, English guitarist and songwriter 
1944 – Rosalía Mera, Spanish businesswoman, co-founded Inditex and Zara (d. 2013)
  1944   – John Tavener, English composer (d. 2013)
1945 – Marthe Keller, Swiss actress and director
1947 – Jeanne Shaheen, American educator and politician, 78th Governor of New Hampshire
1948 – Ilkka Kanerva, Finnish politician (d. 2022)
  1948   – Bob Moses, American drummer
  1948   – Charles Taylor, Liberian politician, 22nd President of Liberia
1949 – Mike Moore, New Zealand union leader and politician, 34th Prime Minister of New Zealand (d. 2020)
  1949   – Jim Wong-Chu, Canadian poet (d. 2017)
  1949   – Gregg Popovich, American basketball player and coach
1950 – Barbi Benton, American actress, singer and model
  1950   – Hamad bin Isa Al Khalifa, Bahraini king
  1950   – David C. Hilmers, American colonel, physician, and astronaut
  1950   – Naila Kabeer, Bangladeshi-English economist and academic
1951 – Brian Bilbray, American politician
  1951   – Leonid Kadeniuk, Ukrainian general, pilot, and astronaut (d. 2018)
  1951   – Billy Bass Nelson, American R&B/funk bass player
1952 – Richard Glatzer, American director, producer, and screenwriter (d. 2015)
1953 – Colin Campbell, Canadian ice hockey player and coach
1954 – Peter Lampe, German theologian and historian
  1954   – Bruno Metsu, French footballer and manager (d. 2013)
  1954   – Rick Warren, American pastor and author
1955 – Vinod Khosla, Indian-American businessman, co-founded Sun Microsystems
  1955   – Nicolas Sarkozy, French lawyer and politician, 23rd President of France
1956 – Richard Danielpour, American composer and educator
  1956   – Peter Schilling, German singer-songwriter
1957 – Mark Napier, Canadian ice hockey player and sportscaster
  1957   – Nick Price, Zimbabwean-South African golfer
  1957   – Frank Skinner, English comedian, actor, and author
1959 – Frank Darabont, American director and producer
1960 – Loren Legarda, Filipino journalist and politician
1961 – Mike Holoway, British musician and actor
  1961   – Normand Rochefort, Canadian ice hockey player and coach
1962 – Keith Hamilton Cobb, American actor
  1962   – Sam Phillips, American singer-songwriter and guitarist
1964 – David Lawrence, English cricketer
1966 – Seiji Mizushima, Japanese director and producer
1967 – Billy Brownless, Australian footballer and sportscaster
1968 – Sarah McLachlan, Canadian singer-songwriter, pianist, and producer
  1968   – Rakim, American rapper
1969 – Giorgio Lamberti, Italian swimmer
  1969   – Mo Rocca, American comedian and television journalist
  1969   – Linda Sánchez, American lawyer and politician
1972 – Amy Coney Barrett, American jurist, academic, attorney, and Associate Justice of the Supreme Court of the United States
  1972   – Mark Regan, English rugby player
  1972   – Nicky Southall, English footballer and manager
  1972   – Léon van Bon, Dutch cyclist
1974 – Tony Delk, American basketball player and coach
  1974   – Jermaine Dye, American baseball player
  1974   – Ramsey Nasr, Dutch author and poet
  1974   – Magglio Ordóñez, Venezuelan baseball player and politician
1975 – Pedro Pinto, Portuguese-American journalist
  1975   – Junior Spivey, American baseball player and coach
1976 – Sireli Bobo, Fijian rugby player
  1976   – Mark Madsen, American basketball player and coach
  1976   – Rick Ross, American rapper and producer
  1976   – Miltiadis Sapanis, Greek footballer
1977 – Sandis Buškevics, Latvian basketball player and coach
  1977   – Daunte Culpepper, American football player
  1977   – Joey Fatone, American singer, dancer, and television personality
  1977   – Takuma Sato, Japanese race car driver
1978 – Gianluigi Buffon, Italian footballer
  1978   – Jamie Carragher, English footballer and sportscaster
  1978   – Papa Bouba Diop, Senegalese footballer (d. 2020)
  1978   – Sheamus, Irish wrestler
  1978   – Big Freedia, American musician
1980 – Nick Carter, American singer-songwriter and actor 
  1980   – Yasuhito Endō, Japanese footballer
  1980   – Michael Hastings, American journalist and author (d. 2013)
  1980   – Brian Fallon, American singer-songwriter
1981 – Elijah Wood, American actor and producer
1984 – Ben Clucas, English race car driver
  1984   – Stephen Gostkowski, American football player
  1984   – Andre Iguodala, American basketball player
  1984   – Anne Panter, English field hockey player
1985 – J. Cole, American rapper
  1985   – Daniel Carcillo, Canadian ice hockey player
  1985   – Lauris Dārziņš, Latvian ice hockey player
  1985   – Arnold Mvuemba, French footballer
  1985   – Libby Trickett, Australian swimmer
1986 – Jessica Ennis-Hill, English heptathlete and hurdler
  1986   – Nathan Outteridge, Australian sailor
  1986   – Asad Shafiq, Pakistani cricketer
1988 – Paul Henry, English footballer
  1988   – Seiya Sanada, Japanese wrestler
1989 – Siem de Jong, Dutch footballer
1991 – Carl Klingberg, Swedish ice hockey player
1992 – Sergio Araujo, Argentinian footballer
1994 – Lin Zhu, Chinese tennis player
1995 – Mimi-Isabella Cesar, British rhythmic gymnast
1998 – Ariel Winter, American actress

Deaths

Pre-1600
 724 – Yazid II, Umayyad caliph (b. 687)
 814 – Charlemagne, Holy Roman emperor (b. 742)
 919 – Zhou Dewei, Chinese general
 929 – Gao Jixing, founder of Chinese Jingnan (b. 858)
 947 – Jing Yanguang, Chinese general (b. 892)
1061 – Spytihněv II, Duke of Bohemia (b. 1031)
1142 – Yue Fei, Chinese general (b. 1103)
1256 – William II, Count of Holland, King of Germany (b. 1227)
1271 – Isabella of Aragon, Queen of France (b. 1247)
1290 – Dervorguilla of Galloway, Scottish noble, mother of king John Balliol of Scotland (b. c. 1210)
1443 – Robert le Maçon, French diplomat (b. 1365)
1501 – John Dynham, 1st Baron Dynham, English baron and Lord High Treasurer (b. 1433)
1547 – Henry VIII, king of England (b. 1491)

1601–1900
1613 – Thomas Bodley, English diplomat and scholar, founded the Bodleian Library (b. 1545)
1621 – Pope Paul V (b. 1550)
1666 – Tommaso Dingli, Maltese architect and sculptor (b. 1591)
1672 – Pierre Séguier, French politician, Lord Chancellor of France (b. 1588)
1681 – Richard Allestree, English priest and academic (b. 1619)
1687 – Johannes Hevelius, Polish astronomer and politician (b. 1611)
1688 – Ferdinand Verbiest, Flemish Jesuit missionary in China (b. 1623)
1697 – Sir John Fenwick, 3rd Baronet, English general and politician (b. 1645)
1754 – Ludvig Holberg, Norwegian-Danish historian and philosopher (b. 1684)
1782 – Jean Baptiste Bourguignon d'Anville, French geographer and cartographer (b. 1697)
1832 – Augustin Daniel Belliard, French general (b. 1769)
1859 – F. J. Robinson, 1st Viscount Goderich, English politician, Prime Minister of the United Kingdom (b. 1782)
1864 – Émile Clapeyron, French physicist and engineer (b. 1799)
1873 – John Hart, English-Australian politician, 10th Premier of South Australia (b. 1809)

1901–present
1903 – Augusta Holmès, French pianist and composer (b. 1847)
1912 – Gustave de Molinari, Belgian economist and theorist (b. 1819). 
  1912   – Eloy Alfaro, former president of Ecuador (b. 1906)
1918 – John McCrae, Canadian soldier, physician, and author (b. 1872)
1921 – Mustafa Suphi, Turkish journalist and politician (b. 1883)
1930 – Emmy Destinn, Czech soprano and poet (b. 1878)
1935 – Mikhail Ippolitov-Ivanov, Russian composer and conductor (b. 1859)
1937 – Anastasios Metaxas, Greek architect and target shooter (b. 1862)
1938 – Bernd Rosemeyer, German race car driver (b. 1909)
1939 – W. B. Yeats, Irish poet and playwright, Nobel Prize laureate (b. 1865)
1942 – Edward Siegler, American gymnast and triathlete (b. 1881)
1945 – Roza Shanina, Russian sergeant and sniper (b. 1924)
1947 – Reynaldo Hahn, Venezuelan-French composer, conductor, and critic (b. 1875)
1948 – Hans Aumeier, German SS officer (b. 1906)
1949 – Jean-Pierre Wimille, French race car driver (b. 1908)
1950 – Nikolai Luzin, Russian mathematician and academic (b. 1883)
1953 – James Scullin, Australian journalist and politician, 9th Prime Minister of Australia (b. 1876)
  1953   – Neyzen Tevfik, Turkish philosopher and poet (b. 1879)
1959 – Walter Beall, American baseball player (b. 1899)
1960 – Zora Neale Hurston, American novelist, short story writer, and folklorist (b. 1891)
1963 – Gustave Garrigou, French cyclist (b. 1884)
1965 – Tich Freeman, English cricketer (b. 1888)
  1965   – Maxime Weygand, Belgian-French general (b. 1867)
1971 – Donald Winnicott, English paediatrician and psychoanalyst (b. 1896)
1973 – John Banner, Austrian actor (b. 1910)
1976 – Marcel Broodthaers, Belgian painter and poet (b. 1924)
1978 – Ward Moore, American author (b. 1903)
1983 – Billy Fury. English pop star (b. 1940)
  1983   – Frank Forde, Australian educator and politician, 15th Prime Minister of Australia (b. 1890)
1986 – Space Shuttle Challenger crew
                Gregory Jarvis, American captain, engineer, and astronaut (b. 1944)
                Christa McAuliffe, American educator and astronaut (b. 1948)
                Ronald McNair, American physicist and astronaut (b. 1950)
                Ellison Onizuka, American engineer and astronaut (b. 1946)
                Judith Resnik, American colonel, engineer, and astronaut (b. 1949)
                Dick Scobee, American colonel, pilot, and astronaut (b. 1939)
                Michael J. Smith, American captain, pilot, and astronaut (b. 1945)
1988 – Klaus Fuchs, German physicist and politician (b. 1911)
1989 – Choekyi Gyaltsen, 10th Panchen Lama (b. 1938)
1993 – Helen Sawyer Hogg, Canadian astronomer and academic (b. 1905)
1996 – Joseph Brodsky, Russian-American poet and essayist, Nobel Prize laureate (b. 1940)
  1996   – Burne Hogarth, American cartoonist and author (b. 1911)
  1996   – Jerry Siegel, American author and illustrator, co-created Superman (b. 1914)
1998 – Shotaro Ishinomori, Japanese author and illustrator (b. 1938)
1999 – Valery Gavrilin, Russian composer (b. 1939)
2001 – Ranko Marinković, Croatian author and playwright (b. 1913)
2002 – Gustaaf Deloor, Belgian cyclist and soldier (b. 1913)
  2002   – Astrid Lindgren, Swedish author and screenwriter (b. 1907)
  2002   – Ayşe Nur Zarakolu, Turkish author and activist (b. 1946)
2003 – Mieke Pullen, Dutch runner (b. 1957)
2004 – Lloyd M. Bucher, American captain (b. 1927)
2005 – Jim Capaldi, English singer-songwriter and drummer (b. 1944)
2007 – Carlo Clerici, Swiss cyclist (b. 1929)
  2007   – Robert Drinan, American priest, lawyer, and politician (b. 1920)
  2007   – Yelena Romanova, Russian runner (b. 1963)
  2007   – Karel Svoboda, Czech composer (b. 1938)
2009 – Werner Flume, German jurist (b. 1908)
  2009   – Billy Powell, American keyboard player and songwriter (b. 1952)
2012 – Roman Juszkiewicz, Polish astronomer and astrophysicist (b. 1952)
  2012   – Don Starkell, Canadian adventurer and author (b. 1932)
2013 – Florentino Fernández, Cuban-American boxer and coach (b. 1936)
  2013   – Hattie N. Harrison, American educator and politician (b. 1928)
  2013   – Oldřich Kulhánek, Czech painter, illustrator, and stage designer (b. 1940)
2014 – John Cacavas, American composer and conductor (b. 1930)
  2014   – Harry Gamble, American football player, coach, and manager (b. 1930)
  2014   – Dwight Gustafson, American composer and conductor (b. 1930)
  2014   – Nigel Jenkins, Welsh poet, journalist, and geographer (b. 1949)
  2014   – Jorge Obeid, Argentinian engineer and politician, Governor of Santa Fe (b. 1947)
2015 – Suraj Abdurrahman, Nigerian general, architect, and engineer (b. 1954)
  2015   – Yves Chauvin, French chemist and academic, Nobel Prize laureate (b. 1930)
  2015   – Lionel Gilbert, Australian historian, author, and academic (b. 1924)
2016 – Signe Toly Anderson, American singer (b. 1941)
  2016   – Paul Kantner, American singer-songwriter and guitarist (b. 1941)
  2016   – Franklin Gene Bissell, American football player and coach (b. 1926)
  2016   – Buddy Cianci, American lawyer and politician, 32nd Mayor of Providence (b. 1941)
  2016   – Bob Tizard, New Zealand lawyer and politician, 6th Deputy Prime Minister of New Zealand (b. 1924)
2017 – Alexander Chancellor, British journalist (b. 1940)
  2017   – Geoff Nicholls, British musician (b. 1948)
2019 – Pepe Smith, Filipino rock musician (b. 1947)
2021 – Cicely Tyson, American actress (b. 1924)

Holidays and observances
Christian feast day:
Joseph Freinademetz
Julian of Cuenca
Thomas Aquinas
January 28 (Eastern Orthodox liturgics)
Army Day (Armenia)
Data Privacy Day

References

External links

 BBC: On This Day
 
 Historical Events on January 28

Days of the year
January